Peter Jehle (born 14 May 1957) is a Swiss handball player. He competed at the 1980 Summer Olympics and the 1984 Summer Olympics.

References

1957 births
Living people
Swiss male handball players
Olympic handball players of Switzerland
Handball players at the 1980 Summer Olympics
Handball players at the 1984 Summer Olympics
Place of birth missing (living people)